The ÇOMÜ Ulupınar Observatory (UPO) is a ground-based astronomical observatory, which was established in 2001 and formally opened on 19 May 2002. It is also known as Çanakkale Observatory or the University Observatory.  The Ulupınar Observatory is part of the Çanakkale Onsekiz Mart University (ÇOMÜ) Faculty of Science and Arts.

The observatory and its research center premises include a library, a workshop, a classroom, a conference hall and living quarters for night observing astronomers.

Ulupınar Observatory began its activity with a donated 0.40m telescope. It has expanded to a facility having seven telescopes operated by 30 scientists. There are three computer-controlled optical telescopes with several other instruments including the biggest telescopes in Turkey, among them a 1.22m telescope made in Germany. There is also an automated meteorological station fully active at the observatory.

Telescopes
T-122
ASTELCO 122 cm Cassegrain-Nasymth telescope
 Altazimuth mount
 Focal length: 10220 mm
 Focal ratio: f/10

IST-60
 Istanbul University collaboration
ASTELCO 60 cm Cassegrain telescope
 German-Equatorial Mount: NTM-500
 Focal length: 6000 mm
 Focal ratio: f/8

T-40
 Meade LX200 model Schmidt–Cassegrain telescope
 Number of objects in memory: 145,000
 Diameter: 
 Optical tube heat adjusting fan
 Focal length: 
 Focal ratio: f/10

T-30 (two pieces)
 Meade LX200 model Schmidt–Cassegrain telescope
 Number of objects in memory: 145,000
 Diameter: 
 Focal Length: 
 Focal Ratio: f/10

T-20
 Aiming for amateur usage
 Newtonian telescope
 Diameter: 
 Focal Ratio: f/10 T-10

SSP-5 Photoelectric photometer
 Computer-controlled
 UBVRI Johnson filters
 Focal length: 
 Optical design: Ramsden
 Field of view: 0.4 degree in  focal length CCD Camera
 Santa Barbara Instrument Group SBIG-ST237 model CCD imaging camera
 Pixel size: 
 Chip size 657 × 495 pixels (4.7 × 3.6 mm)

See also
List of astronomical observatories

References

External links
 ÇOMU - Astrophysics Research Center (ARC) and Ulupınar Observatory (UPO)

Astronomical observatories in Turkey
Çanakkale Onsekiz Mart University
Buildings and structures in Çanakkale Province
2002 establishments in Turkey